State Route 133 (SR 133) is a primary state highway in the U.S. state of Virginia.  Known as Kingsville Road, the state highway runs  from SR 692 at Hampden-Sydney east to U.S. Route 15 (US 15) at Kingsville in central Prince Edward County.  SR 133 provides access to Hampden–Sydney College.

Route description

SR 133 begins at an intersection with SR 692 (College Road) at the hamlet of Hampden-Sydney.  SR 133 heads northeast through a forested area, bypassing the campus of Hampden–Sydney College, while SR 692 passes directly through the campus of the men's college.  SR 133 curves east and meets the eastern end of SR 692 on a tangent before reaching its eastern terminus at US 15 (Farmville Road) at the hamlet of Kingsville south of Farmville.

Major intersections

References

External links

Virginia Highways Project: VA 133

133
State Route 133